Mahmoud Bentayg (Arabic: محمود بنتايك; born 30 October 1999) is a Moroccan professional footballer who plays as a left-back for Botola club Raja Club Athletic.

He began his career as a youth player with AJ Sportive before joining Tihad Athletic Sport in 2020 where he took part and scored in the 2020-21 Confederation Cup, the club's first African participation. In 2022, he finally joined Raja CA after the negotiations have failed the year before.

Early life
Mahmoud Bentayg was born on 30 October 1999 in Hay Mohammadi, an industrial and residential district in the northeast of Casablanca. At young age, he began to play football in the neighborhood amateur teams before joining AJ Sportive.

Club career

Debut with AJS
In 2019, he joined the first team which then played in the Moroccan fourth division. At the end of the 2019-20 season, the team were relegated to the fifth division and Bentayg left the club.

Tihad AS
In November 2020, he joined Tihad Athletic Sport who was playing in Botola 2, and quickly established himself as a starter.

On December 23, he played his first game in international competitions in the first round of the 2020-21 Confederation Cup against ESAE FC. He scored a free kick and assisted the fourth goal (4-0)

On 21 February 2021, he opened the scoring with a lobbed shot against Nkana FC in the next round of the Confederation Cup.

In the 2021 summer, he were very close to join Raja Club Athletic but the transfer fails. In December, the negotiations resume but still without success. At the end of the 2021-22 season, his good performances cannot prevent his team from being relegated to the Third Division.

Transfer to Raja CA
On 18 July 2022, Mahmoud Bentayg finally joined Raja CA by signing a three-year contract. On 10 October in Niamey, he made his debut with in the second round of the 2022-23 Champions League against AS Nigelec (0-2 victory).

On 19 October, he entered at half-time against Hassania Agadir in Botola. In the 93rd minute, he wins a penalty which will be scored by Mohamed Nahiri, giving Raja their first Botola victory of the season.

On 5 November, while Raja was losing to JS Soualem, he caused a penalty which allowed the team to equalize and win (1-4). On 6 January 2023 against Ittihad Tanger, he delivered his first assist for Hamza Khabba who scored the third goal (3-0 victory).

On 14 January 14, he scored his first goal with Raja CA against RS Berkane thanks to a lobbed shot (victory 0-2). Mondher Kebaier stated that he's delighted with Bentayg's performances since he broke through the starting line-up, and had asked him to continue his development in the upcoming games.Some media wrote that he's one of the main reasons Raja regained it's level after a bad season start.

Notes

References

External Links

1999 births
Living people
People from Casablanca
Moroccan footballers
Association football defenders
Raja CA players